Fugueuse (Runaway in English) is a French Canadian television drama series which premiered on January 8, 2018, on TVA. The series stars Ludivine Reding as Fanny Couture, a teenage girl from a middle-class family, who is methodically manipulated into a world of prostitution by a network of human traffickers. The plot continues four years later in Season 2, which premiered on January 6, 2020.

Cast 
 Ludivine Reding: Fanny Couture
 Lynda Johnson: Mylene Couture, Fanny's mother
 Claude Legault: Laurent Couture, Fanny's father
 Jean-François Ruel: Damien Stone/Antoine Tremblay
 Danielle Proulx: Manon, Fanny's grandma
 Kimberly Laferrière: Natacha
 Laurence Latreille: Ariane Béliveau-Leduc
 Camille Felton: Jessica Rivet-De Souza
 Amadou Madani Tall: Fred
 Iannicko N'Doua-Légaré: Carlo Stevenson
 Geneviève Rochette: Sylvie Béliveau, Ariane's mother
 Stéphane Crête: Ariane's father
 Charlotte Aubin: Peggy, Ariane's stepmother
 Miryam 'Mimo' Magri: Michelle Garcia

Production staff 
 Series created by Michelle Allen
 Directed by Eric Tessier
 Music by Christian Clermont
 Produced by François Rozon and Vincent Gagné
 A Encore Television production
 Original network: TVA

Awards 

 Prix Gémeaux 2018 :
 Best actor in a supporting role : Claude Legault

References 

TVA (Canadian TV network) original programming
2018 Canadian television series debuts
2020 Canadian television series endings
2010s Canadian drama television series
2020s Canadian drama television series
Human trafficking